Vincent Carlier (born December 20, 1979 in Paris) is a French defender. He played professionally in Ligue 2 for Angers SCO, Troyes AC and Nîmes Olympique and in the Segunda Liga for Desportivo Aves.

References

Living people
French footballers
1979 births
Angers SCO players
Louhans-Cuiseaux FC players
ES Troyes AC players
Entente SSG players
AS Beauvais Oise players
SO Romorantin players
Nîmes Olympique players
Ligue 2 players
Championnat National players
Association football defenders